Boxing From Sunnyside Gardens was a boxing program aired live from Sunnyside Gardens in Queens, New York on the DuMont Television Network beginning in September 1949 as part of DuMont's sports programming. Most of DuMont's boxing programs at this time were hosted by Dennis James. The program aired Thursdays at 9:30pm ET following The Morey Amsterdam Show. Sunnyside Gardens began hosting boxing in 1945, and was demolished in 1977.

Preservation status
The UCLA Film and Television Archive has several episodes labeled as Boxing With Dennis James but it is unclear if this series is among those held by UCLA.

See also
List of programs broadcast by the DuMont Television Network
List of surviving DuMont Television Network broadcasts
1949-50 United States network television schedule
Boxing From Jamaica Arena (September 1948 – 1949)
Amateur Boxing Fight Club (September 1949 – 1950)
Wrestling From Marigold (September 1949 – 1955)
Boxing From Eastern Parkway (May 1952 – May 1954)
Boxing From St. Nicholas Arena (1954–August 6, 1956) last series aired on the DuMont network
Saturday Night at the Garden (1950–1951)

References

Bibliography
David Weinstein, The Forgotten Network: DuMont and the Birth of American Television (Philadelphia: Temple University Press, 2004) 
Alex McNeil, Total Television, Fourth edition (New York: Penguin Books, 1980) 
Tim Brooks and Earle Marsh, The Complete Directory to Prime Time Network TV Shows, Third edition (New York: Ballantine Books, 1964)

External links
DuMont historical website

DuMont Television Network original programming
1949 American television series debuts
1950 American television series endings
Boxing television series
Black-and-white American television shows
DuMont sports programming